Podgorica (Cyrillic: Подгорица, ; lit. 'under the hill') is the capital and largest city of Montenegro. The city was formerly known as Titograd (Cyrillic: Титоград) between 1946 and 1992—in the period that Montenegro formed, as the Socialist Republic of Montenegro, part of the Socialist Federal Republic of Yugoslavia (SFRY)—in honour of Marshal Josip Broz Tito.

The surrounding landscape is predominantly mountainous terrain. The city is just north of Lake Skadar and close to coastal destinations on the Adriatic Sea. Historically, it was Podgorica's position at the confluence of the Ribnica and Morača rivers and at the meeting-point of the fertile Zeta Plain and Bjelopavlići Valley that encouraged settlement.

Etymology
Gorica, a diminutive of the word Gora (Cyrillic: Гора) which is another word for Mountain or Hill, means "little/small hill", is the name of one of the cypress-covered hillocks that overlooks the city center. Some three kilometres north-west of Podgorica lie the ruins of the Roman-era town of Doclea, from which the Roman Emperor Diocletian's mother hailed. At its foundation (some time before the 11th century), the town was called  (In Illyrian or nowadays Albanian language means Black Hole). In the Middle Ages, it was known as Ribnica. The name Podgorica was used from 1326. From 1946 to 1992, the city was named Titograd in honour of Josip Broz Tito, the President of Socialist Federal Republic of Yugoslavia from 1953 to 1980. In 1992 the city changed its name to "Podgorica", which it remains today.

History

Early history

Podgorica is at the crossroads of several historically important routes, near the rivers Zeta, Morača, Cijevna, Ribnica, Sitnica and Mareza in the valley of Lake Skadar and near the Adriatic Sea, in fertile lowlands with favourable climate. The earliest human settlements were in prehistory: the oldest physical remains are from the late Stone Age.

In the Iron Age, the area between the Zeta and Bjelopavlići valleys was occupied by two Illyrian tribes, the Labeates and the Docleatae. The population of the town of Doclea was 8,000–10,000, in which all core urban issues were resolved. The high population density (in an area of about  radius) was made possible by the geographical position, favorable climate, and economic conditions and by the defensive positions that were of great importance at that time.

Middle Ages
From the fifth century AD, with the arrival of the first Slavic and Avar tribes and the beginning of the break-up of the Roman Empire, the area bore witness to many noteworthy events.  With time, the fortifications ceased their function, and new towns were built; a new settlement probably named after the Ribnica river, on whose banks it was built, Ribnica, was established. It was first mentioned during the reign of the Nemanjić dynasty, as part of the Serbian kingdom. The importance of Ribnica was its position as crossroads in communications with the west. 

The name Podgorica was first mentioned in 1326 in a court document of the Kotor archives. The city was economically strong: trade routes between the Republic of Ragusa and Serbia, well developed at that time, were maintained via the road that led to Podgorica through Trebinje and Nikšić. As a busy crossroads, Podgorica was a vibrant regional center of trade and communication. This boosted its development, economic power, military strength, and strategic importance.

Ottoman Empire

The Ottoman Empire captured Podgorica in 1474. Podgorica became a kaza of the Sanjak of Scutari (which was historically led by Albanian Pashas). In 1479, The Ottomans built a large fortress in Podgorica, and the existing settlement, with its highly developed merchant connections, became the main Ottoman defensive and attacking bastion in the region. At the beginning of 1474 the Ottoman sultan intended to rebuild Podgorica and Baleč and settle them with 5,000 Muslim families (most of them of Albanian or Slavic origin), in order to stop cooperation between the Principality of Zeta and Albania Veneta.

Podgorica fell again, but this time to the Ottomans in 1484, and the character of the town changed extensively. The Ottomans fortified the city, building towers, gates, and defensive ramparts that give Podgorica the appearance of an Ottoman military city.

Most of today's Montenegro and Podgorica fell under the rule of the Albanian Bushati Family of Shkodra between 1760 and 1831, which ruled independently from the Imperial authority of the Ottoman Sultan.

In 1864, Podgorica became a kaze of the Scutari Vilayet called Böğürtlen ("blackberry", also known as Burguriçe).

On 7 October 1874, in a violent reaction over the murder of a local named Juso Mučin Krnić, Ottoman forces killed at least 15 people in Podgorica. The massacre was widely reported outside of Montenegro and ultimately contributed to the buildup to the Montenegrin-Ottoman War.

The end of the Montenegrin-Ottoman War in 1878 resulted in the Congress of Berlin recognizing vast territories, including that of Podgorica, as part of the newly recognized Kingdom of Montenegro. At that time there were about 1,500 houses in Podgorica, with more than 8,000 people living there – of Orthodox, Roman Catholic, and Muslim faiths flourishing together.

The Petrović and Karađorđević monarchies

After the Berlin Congress in 1878, when Podgorica was annexed to the Principality of Montenegro, marking the end of four centuries of Ottoman rule, and the beginning of a new era for Podgorica and Montenegro. The first forms of capital concentration were seen in 1902 when roads were built to all neighboring towns, and tobacco became Podgorica's first significant commercial product. Then in 1904, a savings bank named Zetska formed the first significant financial institution, and it would soon grow into Podgorička Bank.

World War I marked the end of dynamic development for Podgorica, which by then was the largest city in the newly proclaimed Kingdom of Montenegro. On 10 August 1914, nine military personnel and 13 civilians were killed in Podgorica from an aerial bombardment by Austro-Hungarian Aviation Troops. The city was bombed three more times in 1915. Podgorica was occupied, as was the rest of the country, by Austria-Hungary from 1916 to 1918.

After the liberation by the Allies in 1918, the controversial Podgorica Assembly marked the end of Montenegrin statehood, as Montenegro was merged with the Kingdom of Serbia and incorporated into the Kingdom of Serbs, Croats, and Slovenes. The population of urban Podgorica during this interwar period was approximately 14,000.

During the interwar period (1918–1941), Podgorica had public bathrooms as most residents did not have their own. However, the Imperial hotel built in 1925 had two bathrooms, which was unprecedented at the time. It was one of at least six hotels built in the city during the interwar period.

World War II

After the Yugoslav coup d'état on 27 March 1941, demonstrations supporting the coup took place in Podgorica. As a result of the coup, Yugoslavia turned against its previous alliance with the Axis powers and was subsequently invaded. Podgorica was bombed over 80 times throughout the course of the war. The city was first bombed by the Luftwaffe on 6 April 1941. On 5 May 1944, Podgorica was bombed by the USAAF in an attack against Axis forces, although the bombardment that day killed approximately 400 civilians. The city was liberated on 19 December 1944. According to the Belgrade Museum of Genocide Victims, a total of 1,691 people were killed in Podgorica over the course of the war.

Socialist Yugoslavia
On 12 July 1946, Josip Broz Tito made one of his early visits to Podgorica from the Radovče hotel, where he spoke to a crowd. It was the first of fifteen total visits made by Tito to the city after World War II.

On 25 July 1948, the vice president of the People's Parliament of Montenegro, Andrija Mugoša, along with secretary Gavron Cemović, signed a law changing the name of Podgorica into "Titovgrad". The law was "retroactively" activated such that the name change applied to any records starting from 13 July 1946, when it became the capital of Montenegro within the newly formed Socialist Federal Republic of Yugoslavia. However, in a glaring contradiction, the "Službeni list" or legal code of Yugoslavia recorded the name "Titograd" without the letter "v". Ultimately, "Titograd" was used over "Titovgrad".

In addition to the new name, Titograd saw the establishment of new factories. The Radoje Dakić factory, built-in 1946 for the production of heavy machinery, became one of the largest employers in Titograd. In 1964, Radoje Dakić guaranteed hired workers an apartment in the city. In the late 1960s, the cities of Titograd, Zadar, and Mostar competed to be selected as the location of Yugoslavia's expanding aluminum industry. In a highly politicized selection process, Titograd was ultimately chosen and the Kombinat was constructed in 1969. In 1974, the public Veljko Vlahović University was founded in Titograd. On 15 April 1979, the city suffered damage by a 6.9 magnitude earthquake.

Titograd was the site of massive protests during Yugoslavia's anti-bureaucratic revolution. On 10 January 1989, over 10,000 people protested in the city. By the turn of the decade, Titograd was recognized as the city with the most greenery in Yugoslavia, along with Banja Luka.

Contemporary history
As Yugoslavia began to break up, Titograd was renamed to Podgorica after a referendum on 2 April 1992. On 25 May 1992, Podgorica was the site of a Serbian Radical Party rally of approximately 10,000 supporters, during which a Montenegrin Bosniak man named Adem Šabotić attempted to assassinate Vojislav Šešelj via hand bomb after his supporters chanted references to killing Muslims. Šešelj, his bodyguards, and a few bystanders were injured after the bomb detonated but no one was killed.

Otherwise, the Yugoslav wars largely bypassed Podgorica, but the entire country was greatly affected with severe economic stagnation and hyperinflation lasting throughout the 1990s due to international sanctions. In 1999, Podgorica was subject to airstrikes during the NATO bombing of Yugoslavia.

On 13 July 2005, the newly constructed Millennium Bridge opened for traffic. Following the results of the independence referendum in May 2006, Podgorica saw significant development as the capital of an independent state, including the reconstruction and renaming of the former Ivan Milutinović Square to Independence Square.

On 13 October 2008, at least 10,000 people protested against Kosovo's declaration of independence. On 19 December 2008, the Moscow Bridge opened for pedestrians.

On 7 August 2013, the 60-year old Hotel Crna Gora was demolished to make way for the new Hilton in its place, which opened in 2016. Construction of the Cathedral of Christ's Resurrection finished after 20 years on 7 October 2013.

In October 2015, protests took place in Podgorica ahead of Montenegro's accession into NATO. After a demonstration of at least 5,000 to 8,000 people, the police used tear gas to disperse demonstrators from the parliament. Protests in the city continued through the 2016 Montenegrin parliamentary election. On 22 February 2018, a Yugoslav Army veteran killed himself at the US embassy in Podgorica.

Administration

The city administration consists of a mayor, city assembly, and a number of secretariats and administrative bodies which together act as a city local government. The city assembly has 61 members, elected directly for four-year terms. The mayor used to be directly elected for a five-year term, but since the new law was introduced in Montenegrin municipalities mayors will be elected by the city assembly and will have to maintain its support during the term. Separate elections are held for the local sub-division of Golubovci since it is part of their administrative autonomy inside Podgorica municipality. Constant questions are raised by various politicians over gaining separate municipality status for Golubovci. In 2018, Tuzi became its own municipality after a vote on the Montenegrin Parliament.

On local elections held on 25 May 2014, the Democratic Party of Socialists won 29 seats in the municipal assembly, one short of 30 needed to form a majority. Democratic Front won 17 seats, SNP won 8 seats, while coalition made of Positive Montenegro and SDP won 5 seats. After lengthy negotiations, SDP dissolved coalition with Pozitivna and made an arrangement on forming a majority with DPS, similar to one they have in national government. While SDP is a longtime partner of DPS at the national level, it has been in opposition to Podgorica municipal assembly in 2010–2014 period. 
Since October 2014, the position of the mayor is held by DPS official, Slavoljub Stijepović, replacing Podgorica mayor od 14 years, Miomir Mugoša. Since October 2018, the position of the Mayor is held by DPS Vicepredsident dr Ivan Vuković, replacing Slavoljub Stijepović.

City Assembly

Local subdivisions

The municipality of Podgorica consists of Podgorica City Proper and one subdivision (called city municipality, градске општине, gradske opštine), which is Golubovci.

The entire municipality of Podgorica is further divided into 57 local communities (мјесне заједнице, mjesne zajednice), bodies in which the citizens participate in decisions on matters of relevance to the local community.

Geography
Podgorica is located in central Montenegro. The Morača and Ribnica rivers flow through the city, while the Zeta, Cijevna, Sitnica and Mareza flow nearby. Except for the Morača and Zeta, other rivers have an appearance of small creeks. The richness in bodies of water is a major feature of the city.

The only exceptions are hills which overlook the city. The other hills include Malo brdo ("little hill"), Velje brdo ("big hill"), Ljubović and Dajbapska gora. 

Climate

The number of rainy days is about 120, and those with a strong wind around 60. An occasional strong northerly wind influences the climate in the winter, with a wind chill effect lowering the perceived temperature by a few degrees. 

The all-time maximum snowfall record was beaten on 11 February 2012, when  of snowfall were measured. Before that, the biggest snowfall in Podgorica was in 1954, when  of snowfall was recorded.

Demographics
In the Ottoman defter of 1485, 40 households were listed.

In 1614, there were over 900 households.

Although medium-sized by European standards, Podgorica is by far the largest city in Montenegro: almost a quarter of Montenegrin citizens live there. According to the 2011 census, there are 185,937 people in Podgorica Capital City, which is analogous to the metropolitan area, and includes the small towns of Tuzi and Golubovci, while 150,977 people live within the city proper.

Out of the total population of Podgorica 48.73% are male and 51.27% are female. The average age of the population is 35.7.

Religion

Podgorica is home to three main religious groups: Orthodox Christians, Sunni Muslims and Catholic Christians.

The Orthodox Christian population mostly originates from the local Montenegrin and Serb population, which accepted Orthodox Christianity in Middle Ages after a major split during The Great Schism. They represent the major religious group. There are various Eastern Orthodox churches in the city including St. George Church which originates from the 13th century, and the Cathedral of the Resurrection of Christ which is the largest church in the city to have been recently erected.

The Muslim population mostly originates from local Bosniaks, as well as Albanians.  There are several mosques in Podgorica.

The Catholic population mainly consists of the local Albanian minority. The main religious site for the Catholic population located in the Konik neighbourhood is the Church of the Holy Heart of Jesus constructed in 1966, in Brutalist style which makes this object unique. Other Catholic churches are located in eastern suburb Tuzi.

Economy
Podgorica is not only the administrative center of Montenegro but also its main economic engine. Most of Montenegro's industrial, financial, and commercial base is in Podgorica. 

Before World War I, most of Podgorica's economy was in trade and small-scale manufacturing, which was an economic model established during the long rule of the Ottoman Empire.  After World War II, Podgorica became Montenegro's capital and a focus of the rapid urbanization and industrialization of the SFRY era. Industries such as aluminium and tobacco processing, textiles, engineering, vehicle production, and wine production were established in and around the city. In 1981, Podgorica's GDP per capita was 87% of the Yugoslav average.

In the early 1990s, the dissolution of Yugoslavia, Yugoslav wars, and the UN-imposed sanctions left Podgorica's industries without traditional markets, suppliers, and available funds. This, combined with typical transition pressures, led to a decline of the industrial base, where many industries collapsed leaving thousands of citizens unemployed.  However, some of the industries, including Plantaže, managed to survive the turmoil of the 1990s, and are still major contributors to Montenegrin export and industrial output to this day.

As Montenegro began its push for independence from Serbia in the late 1990s, Podgorica greatly benefited from the increased concentration of government and service sectors.  In addition to almost the entire country's government, Podgorica is home to the Montenegro Stock Exchange and other major Montenegrin financial institutions, along with telecommunications carriers, media outlets, Montenegrin flag carrier airline, and other significant institutions and companies.

The large presence of government and service sectors spared the economy of Podgorica from prolonged stagnation in the late 2000s recession, which hit Montenegro hard. Although in mid-2014, some 30% of Montenegro's citizens lived in Podgorica, the municipality accounted for 44% of the country's employed. Out of the entire mass of paid net salaries in Montenegro in that year, some 47% was paid in Podgorica. The average monthly net salary in December 2021 was €537 in Podgorica municipality.

Tourism
Further cultural and historic monuments in and around Podgorica are Sahat-kula Adzi-pasa Osmanagica, the ruins of the Ribnica fortress, remnants of the city of Doclea, Stara Varoš, and Vezirov. Podgorica has excellent transit connections with other centres.

At nine kilometres from the city is the International Airport, with railway and bus stations close to one another.

Media
Podgorica is the media hub of Montenegro. It is home to the headquarters of the state-owned public television broadcaster RTCG. It has also its local tv and radio station Gradska. Commercial broadcasters in Podgorica include TV Vijesti, Prva TV, Nova M and Adria TV.
All Montenegro's daily newspapers (oldest Montenegrin daily newspaper Pobjeda, Vijesti, Dnevne Novine and Dan) are published in Podgorica.

Transport

Public transport

Public transport in Podgorica consists of 11 urban and 16 suburban bus lines. The city-owned AD Gradski saobraćaj public transport company used to be the sole bus operator until the 1990s, when private carriers were introduced. The company went bankrupt in 2001, and buses were since operated solely by private carriers.

Public transport faces competition from very popular dispatched taxi services. De-regulation and stiff competition have made taxi services very affordable.  Over 20 taxi companies are operating in Podgorica with close to 800 vehicles in service.  Usually, taxi companies provide a high level of service, with relatively new and uniform car fleets and GPS-tracked vehicles.

Roads

Podgorica's location in central Montenegro makes it a natural hub for rail and road transport. Roads in Montenegro (especially those connecting Podgorica to northern Montenegro and Serbia) are usually inferior to modern European roads. Both major Montenegrin motorway projects, Bar-Boljare motorway and Nudo–Božaj motorway, will pass near Podgorica. The first phase of motorway A-1 (Bar-Boljari) was opened on July 13, 2022. The Sozina tunnel (4.2 km) shortened the journey from Podgorica to Bar (Montenegro's main seaport) to under 30 minutes. A new road bypass had been constructed in 2011, to remove transport routes from north to south of the country, out of the city center. A south-western bypass had also been constructed with the same goal of moving heavy transport out of the city core. Podgorica is also characteristic of its extensive network of multi-lane boulevards which make inner-city transport quick and effective. Traffic over the Morača River also goes fluently since river banks are very well connected with 6 vehicular and 3 pedestrian bridges.

The main transit connections of Podgorica are:
 north (E65, E80), towards Belgrade and on to Central Europe
 west (E762), towards Nikšić, Bosnia and on to Western Europe
 south (E65, E80) towards the Adriatic coast
 east (E762), towards Albania

Rail

Podgorica is a hub of the X-shaped Montenegrin rail network. The Belgrade–Bar line converges with the line to Nikšić and line to Shkodër at the Podgorica Rail Station. Podgorica's main railway link (for both passenger and freight traffic) is Belgrade–Bar. The link to Nikšić was recently under reconstruction (electrification); afterwards, passenger service started in October 2012. The rail link to Shkodër is used as freight-only.

Air

The airport is locally known as Golubovci Airport (Аеродром Голубовци / Aerodrom Golubovci), as it is located within the administrative boundaries of the town of Golubovci. The IATA code of the airport is still TGD because Podgorica was named Titograd, during which time the airport opened. It is the main hub for Air Montenegro and Di Air.

Education

Most of Montenegro's higher education establishments are in Podgorica including the University of Montenegro, the country's most significant university. The university has the following faculties:

 Faculty of Political Sciences
 Faculty of Law
 Faculty of Economics
 Faculty of Electrical Engineering
 Faculty of Metallurgy and Technology
 Faculty for Information Technology
 Faculty of Civil Engineering

 Faculty of Mechanical Engineering
 Faculty of Natural Sciences and Mathematics
 Faculty of Medicine
 Faculty of Pharmacy
 Faculty of Architecture
 Faculty of Biotechnology

The university's scientific research institutes are also in the Podgorica: Institute of Foreign Languages, Institute of Biotechnology and the Institute of History

The Montenegrin Academy of Sciences and Arts (CANU) is in Podgorica, as well as the parallel scholars' academy DANU.

There are a number of private institutions for higher education including the Mediterranean University which was founded in 2006 as the first private university in Montenegro and the University of Donja Gorica. The municipality of Podgorica has 34 elementary schools and 10 secondary schools, including one gymnasium. The first secondary school established in Podgorica is Gymnasium "Slobodan Škerović" which first opened in 1907. The rebuilt economic high school offers new features and higher quality education. The "Radosav Ljumović National Library" is considered the most comprehensive in Montenegro.

Culture
Podgorica is home to many Montenegrin cultural institutions and events. It hosts the Montenegrin National Theatre and a number of museums and galleries. The Montenegrin National Theatre is the most significant theatre not only in Podgorica but in all of Montenegro. Podgorica is also host to the City Theatre (Gradsko pozorište), which includes the Children's Theatre and the Puppet Theatre. Although not as rich in museums and galleries as the historic royal capital Cetinje, there are several noteworthy museums:
 The Podgorica City Museum (Muzej grada Podgorice) preserves Podgorica's rich heritage. Founded in 1950, it has four categories: archaeological, ethnographic, historical, and cultural-historical. It houses artifacts that date back to the Roman and Illyrian eras. 
 The Archaeological Research Centre (Centar za arheološka istraživanja) was founded in 1961. Its mission is to gather, classify, restore and display archaeological sites.
 The Marko Miljanov Museum (Muzej Marka Miljanova) in Medun shows life in 19th century Montenegro. 
 The Natural History Museum (Prirodnjački muzej) displays specimens of Montenegrin flora and fauna. This museum has no exhibition space of its own, despite many proposals and initiatives to build one. 
There is a notable art gallery in the Dvorak Petrovića (Petrović Castle) complex in Podgorica's largest public park. King Nicholas's castle, Perjanički Dom (House of the Honour Guard), castle chapel and surrounding buildings were converted to an art gallery in 1984. Since 1995, it has been part of the Modern Arts Centre (Centar savremenih umjetnosti) and houses approximately 1,500 works of art. The historic Cinema of Culture (Kino Kultura), which was founded in 1949, was closed in November 2008 due to continuous financial losses it generated. It was the only cinema in the city for 6 decades. The building of the former cinema will be converted to host the Podgorica City Theatre. Shortly after its closure, a Ster-Kinekor (later acquired by Cineplexx) 6-screen multiplex cinema opened at BIG Podgorica shopping mall.

A significant cultural institution of over fifty years' standing is the Budo Tomović Cultural-Informational Centre (KIC Budo Tomović). It is a public institution that organizes various artistic events, including Podgorica Cultural Summer (Podgoričko Kulturno Ljeto), FIAT – International Alternative Theatre Festival (Festival Internacionalnog Alternativnog Teatra), DEUS – December Arts Scene (Decembarska Umjetnička Scena).

Sport

The most popular sports by far are football and basketball. Basketball became especially popular with the success in the late 20th and early 21st centuries of KK Budućnost, both in Regional and European competitions.

Football in Podgorica has a long tradition associated with Budućnost. World-famous players Predrag Mijatović and Dejan Savićević were born in Podgorica and made their debut in that team. The club FK Zeta from the Podgorica suburb of Golubovci has also reached the former first league of Serbia and Montenegro. These clubs, along with Sutjeska from Nikšić, usually compete with each other for leading position in the First League of Montenegro.
Other clubs from Podgorica and its surroundings play in the Montenegrin First League e.g. OFK Titograd & Kom. One of the most popular clubs from the suburbs is FK Ribnica from Konik, FK Zabjelo from Zabjelo and FK Podgorica from Donja Gorica.

The volleyball team OK Budućnost and the women's handball team ŽRK Budućnost T-Mobile have had significant success in European competition. Budućnost Podgorica is the most important sports club in Podgorica. Its name means Future.

Chess is another popular sport and some famous global chess players, like Slavko Dedić, are born in Podgorica.

Sporting events like the annual Podgorica Marathon, Coinis no limits Triathlon, and the Morača River jumps attract international competitors.
Podgorica was the host of 2009 FINA Men's Water Polo World League.

Venues
Podgorica has a number of sporting venues; some are under reconstruction and expansion. The main ones are:
Podgorica City Stadium. It has a capacity of 11,264 and it is the home of FK Budućnost Podgorica and the Montenegro national football team. It is the only venue in Montenegro that complies with FIFA standards for international football matches.
Morača Sports Center, a multi-functional indoor sports facility. It has a capacity of 6 000 seats. It hosted one group of EuroBasket 2005, while other games were played in Belgrade, Vršac, and Novi Sad.
Bemax Arena, newly opened, basketball indoor and outdoor sports facility. It has a capacity of 2.400 seats.

Almost every football club in Podgorica has its own stadium, although these are often only fields with small stands or no stands at all.
Other notable venues are the Stadion malih sportova under Gorica hill and the sport shooting range under Ljubović hill. There are many other sports facilities around the city, most notably indoor soccer fields.

Cityscape

Podgorica's mixture of architectural styles reflects the turbulent history of the city and country: as one régime replaced another, the corresponding style was introduced.

As part of the Ottoman Empire until 1878, Podgorica has some examples of Ottoman architecture.  The oldest parts of the city, Stara Varoš (Old town) and Drač is typical of this, with two mosques, a Turkish Clock Tower and narrow, winding streets.

When the city was incorporated to Montenegro, the urban core shifted to the other bank of the Ribnica River, where the town developed in a more European style: wider streets with an orthogonal layout. This part of the city is today traditionally regarded as the city center and is called Nova Varoš (New town).

During World War II, Podgorica was almost razed to the ground, being bombed over 80 times. After liberation, rebuilding began as in other cities of the communist-ruled SFRY. Mass residential blocks were erected, with basic design typical of Eastern bloc countries.  All that part of the city on the right bank of the Morača River was built this way.

The main contemporary traffic arteries were laid out during this period, which extended the orthogonal street layout of the city center, to the south and west. Residential and infrastructural developments in the SFRY era have mostly shaped the layout of today's Podgorica and accommodated the unprecedented population growth that followed World War II. 

A major advance in Podgorica architecture began in the late 1990s and, since then, the face of the city has changed rapidly. Residential and business construction are proceeding rapidly, incorporating contemporary glass-and-steel architectural trends. In an effort to create a recognizable and modern state capital, city officials are routing significant investments in the city's public spaces. Thus, the city has gained entirely new squares and some monuments. New landmarks include the Hristovog Vaskrsenja orthodox temple and the Millennium Bridge, the main feature of the Podgorica skyline.

Notable people 

Below are some of the most notable people who were either born or spent most of their lives in Podgorica:

Božidar Vuković, one of the first South Slavic printers
Blažo Jovanović, communist politician
Dejan Savićević, football player
Predrag Mijatović, football player
Stevan Jovetić, football player
Milos Raonic, Canadian tennis player
Duško Vujošević, Montenegrin basketball coach
Marko Miljanov, general, clan chief and writer
Vojo Stanić, sculptor and painter
Risto Stijović, sculptor and painter
Borislav Pekić, novelist
Anđela Bulatović, handball player
Zoran Filipović football player and coach
Duško Radinović, football player
Simon Vukčević, football player
Refik Šabanadžović football player
Dejan Zlatičanin, boxer
Dejan Radonjić, basketball player and coach
Nikola Bulatović, basketball player
Ljiljana Mugoša, handball player
Svetlana Mugoša-Antić, handball player
Nikola Mirotić, Spanish basketball player
Ivan Strugar, kick-boxer
Baćko, notable hairdresser
Slavko Kalezić, singer and actor
Nenad Knežević "Knez", pop singer
Sergej Ćetković, pop singer

International relations

Twin towns – sister cities

Podgorica is twinned with:

 Ankara, Turkey
 Bari, Italy
 Naousa, Greece
 Skopje, North Macedonia
 Sarajevo, Bosnia and Herzegovina

Partner cities
 Yerevan, Armenia

See also

Outline of Montenegro
Podgorica Capital City

Notes

References

External links
 
 
 
 Tourism Organisation of Podgorica
 More (mostly modern) buildings of Podgorica

 
Capitals in Europe
Populated places in Podgorica Municipality